Frederick Richard Trench (1681 – 3 October 1752) was an Irish politician.

He was the eldest son of Frederick Trench and his wife Elizabeth Warburton, daughter of Richard Warburton, a Member of Parliament for Ballyshannon. Trench was appointed High Sheriff of County Galway in 1703 and colonel of the Galway Militia. He sat for Galway County in the Irish House of Commons from 1715 until his death in 1752.

On 7 September 1703, he married Elizabeth Eyre, daughter of John Eyre. They had ten children, four sons and six daughters. His second son Richard represented the same constituency and was ancestor of the Earls of Clancarty.

References

1681 births
1752 deaths
High Sheriffs of County Galway
Irish MPs 1715–1727
Irish MPs 1727–1760
Members of the Parliament of Ireland (pre-1801) for County Galway constituencies
Politicians from County Galway
Frederick